Peter Klein (born 21 February 1959 in Schötmar, North Rhine-Westphalia) is a retired West German sprinter who specialized in the 100 metres. He was a double national champion in the 100 m and 200 metres at the 1990 West German Athletics Championships, making him the last champion of those events before East and West German athletes resumed a shared competition.

At the 1982 European Championships he helped win the 4 x 100 metres relay with teammates Christian Zirkelbach, Christian Haas and Erwin Skamrahl. He finished fifth at the 1984 Summer Olympics and sixth at the 1988 Summer Olympics, both times in the relay. He also competed at the 1986 European Championships, the 1987 World Championships and the 1990 European Championships without reaching the finals.

Peter Klein represented the sports team SV Salamander Kornwestheim.

References

1959 births
Living people
People from Bad Salzuflen
Sportspeople from Detmold (region)
West German male sprinters
German male sprinters
Olympic athletes of West Germany
Athletes (track and field) at the 1984 Summer Olympics
Athletes (track and field) at the 1988 Summer Olympics
World Athletics Championships athletes for West Germany
European Athletics Championships medalists
West German Athletics Championships winners
SV Salamander Kornwestheim athletes